The Asus ZenFone 8 is an Android-based phone designed, developed and manufactured by Asus as part of its Asus ZenFone series. It was announced on 12 May 2021.

History 
On 13 May Asus announced the ZenFone8 and ZenFone8 Pro, which were announced and sold in Hong Kong on the same day. The devices were launched on 28 May in Malaysia.

On 12 May 2021, ASUS announced ZenFone 8 (ZenFone 8 Compact) and ZenFone 8 Flip under the slogan "Big on Performance. Compact in Size." They were released later on 13 May 2021, featuring a Qualcomm Snapdragon 888 5G chipset, with Corning Gorilla Glass 6 (Victus in Compact ver.) protection and they support 5G. Their display design is Samsung Super AMOLED screen with 120 Hz (90 Hz in Flip ver.) of refresh rate. ZenFone 8 Flip (also known as ZenFone 8 Pro) retains the current previous generation's camera but with improved performance, similar to ZenFone 8 compact. ZenFone 8 (also known as ZenFone 8 compact, ZenFone 8 mini) returns the cameras back to the same as ZenFone 5 (2018), but has Infinity-O display with 64 MP + 12 MP rear cameras similar to ZenFone 5. It has a 4000 mAh battery and includes IP68 water resistance and a fingerprint sensor on display.

Variants

References

External links 
 

Android (operating system) devices
Asus ZenFone
Mobile phones introduced in 2021
Mobile phones with 8K video recording
Mobile phones with multiple rear cameras
Flagship smartphones